Le Bahia is a high-rise residential building in Monaco.

Location
It is located at 39 Avenue Princesse Grace in the Larvotto district of Monaco.

History
The construction of the building was completed in 1971. It was built by the Monegasque construction firm, J. B. Pastor et fils. It was designed in the modernist architectural style. It is 38.35 metres high, with twelve storeys.

It was owned by heiress Hélène Pastor through her eponymous real estate company.

The building is mostly residential. However, it is also home to some shops.

References

Residential buildings in Monaco
Modernist architecture in Monaco
Buildings and structures completed in 1971
Pastor family